The 1949 Southern Jaguars football team was an American football team that represented Southern University in the Southwestern Athletic Conference (SWAC) during the 1949 college football season. In their 14th season under head coach Ace Mumford, the Jaguars compiled a 10–0–1 record (6–0–1 against SWAC opponents), won the SWAC championship, and outscored all opponents by a total of 405 to 65. The team played its home games at University Stadium in Baton Rouge, Louisiana. The team was recognized by some as the black college national champion, though the Pittsburgh Courier with its Dickinson Rating System rated Southern at No. 2 behind Morgan State.

Schedule

References

Southern
Southern Jaguars football seasons
College football undefeated seasons
Southwestern Athletic Conference football champion seasons
Black college football national champions
Southern Jaguars football